Wayne Roger Haylen QC is a Judge of the New South Wales Industrial Court.

Education
Haylen was educated at Canterbury Boys High School before attending the University of Sydney.  He founded the Youth Campaign Against Conscription and in September 1965 took the initiative in regular mass demonstrations against the war and conscription, he was photographed burning his national service registration card at a rally in Belmore Park Sydney on 3 February 1966.  A BA was conferred in 1967 and an LL.B. in 1971.

Career
Wayne Haylen was admitted to the Bar in 1976 and practised as a barrister in Sydney (14th Floor Wardell Chambers), H.B. Higgins Chambers and Denman Chambers until 2001.

He also had Chambers in Melbourne (Evatt Floor, Douglas Menzies Chambers) and has been admitted in Victoria, Queensland and Western Australia.  In 1990 he was admitted to the Inner Bar (NSW).

At the Bar his main areas of practise were Industrial Law; Administrative Law; Anti-Discrimination and Legal Professional Standards & Discipline.

Haylen J became a Judge of the Industrial Court of New South Wales in 2001, he is also a Deputy President Member, Industrial Court of NSW.

Haylen J was appointed by the NSW Attorney-General, John Hatzistergos to part-time deputy president of the Administrative Decisions Tribunal and head of the tribunal's legal services division in 2008.

Family and social matters
He married Joan Evatt in 1973 and they have a son and daughter.  Haylen's recreational interests include racing, golf, racehorse breeding, and theatre. aka 'His Nibs'.

Positions and memberships
Haylen is a member of the following:
 Racing Appeals Tribunal 2002–present
 Harness Racing Appeals Tribunal 2003–present
 Greyhound Racing Appeals Tribunal 2003–present
 Racing Appeals Panel
 NSW Thoroughbred Racing Board 1997-2001
 Australian Consumers Association 1978–1994, chairman 1988-1994
 Local Government Minister's Reform Task Force 1996-1999
 NSW Privacy Committee 1981-1993
 NSW Consumers Advisory Council established under the Consumer Protection Act and appointed by the Minister to represent the interests of consumers 1978-82
 Chairman & Trustee National Jockeys Trust 2020–present

Honours
 1967 Certificate of Appreciation from the Commissioner of Police re the apprehension of a person convicted of shooting with intent to murder Rt Hon A. A. Calwell, Leader of the Opposition
 1977 Recipient of Queen's Silver Jubilee Medal

Professional publications
 Editorial Board: "Human Resources Law Bulletin" (1996-2001)
 Co-Editor: "Mills - Federal Industrial Law" with M Moore
 Consultant: "Mills - Federal Industrial Law" (1980-1981)
 Reporter: "Australian Law Reports" (1976-1979)

References

Living people
Year of birth missing (living people)
21st-century Australian judges
Australian King's Counsel